Gobseck is a 1924 German silent drama film directed by Preben J. Rist and starring Otto Gebühr and Clementine Plessner.

Cast
In alphabetical order
 Henry Bender as Simons - Bankdirektor 
 Rolf Brunner as Dr. Bergner 
 Eugen Burg as Graf Otto Hohnthal 
 Gertrud de Lalsky as Paronon Plessnitz 
 Evi Eva as Gerda 
 Otto Gebühr as Jean Esther von Gobseck 
 Ernst Hofmann as Horst 
 Lissi Lind as Hermine 
 Emil Mamelok as Frh. v. Landes 
 Hermann Picha as Bürovorsteher 
 Clementine Plessner as seine Wirtschafterin

References

Bibliography
 Grange, William. Cultural Chronicle of the Weimar Republic. Scarecrow Press, 2008.

External links

1924 films
Films of the Weimar Republic

German silent feature films
German black-and-white films
Films based on works by Honoré de Balzac
German drama films
1924 drama films
Silent drama films
1920s German films